Peter Hatch is the name of:

Peter Hatch (cricketer), English cricketer
Peter Hatch (footballer), English footballer
Peter Hatch (government official), American government official